The Milwaukee Brewers' 2004 season involved the Brewers' finishing 6th in the National League Central with a record of 67 wins and 94 losses. The main highlight of the Brewers season was on the big screen, as the franchise was portrayed fictionally in the sports comedy Mr. 3000, starting Bernie Mac.

Offseason
 November 13, 2003: Chris Coste signed as a free agent with the Milwaukee Brewers.
December 1, 2003: Lyle Overbay was traded by the Arizona Diamondbacks with Chris Capuano, Craig Counsell, Chad Moeller, Jorge de la Rosa, and Junior Spivey to the Milwaukee Brewers for a player to be named later, Richie Sexson, and Shane Nance. The Milwaukee Brewers sent Noochie Varner (minors) (December 15, 2003) to the Arizona Diamondbacks to complete the trade.
January 26, 2004: Scott Sheldon was signed as a free agent with the Milwaukee Brewers.

Regular season

Season standings

National League Central

Record vs. opponents

Transactions
June 14, 2004: Scott Sheldon was released by the Milwaukee Brewers.
July 26, 2004: Russell Branyan was sent to the Milwaukee Brewers by the Cleveland Indians as part of a conditional deal.

Roster

Player stats

Batting

Starters by position
Note: Pos = Position; G = Games played; AB = At bats; H = Hits; Avg. = Batting average; HR = Home runs; RBI = Runs batted in

Other batters
Note: G = Games played; AB = At bats; H = Hits; Avg. = Batting average; HR = Home runs; RBI = Runs batted in

Pitching

Starting pitchers
Note: G = Games pitched; IP = Innings pitched; W = Wins; L = Losses; ERA = Earned run average; SO = Strikeouts

Other pitchers
Note: G = Games pitched; IP = Innings pitched; W = Wins; L = Losses; ERA = Earned run average; SO = Strikeouts

Relief pitchers
Note: G = Games pitched; W = Wins; L = Losses; SV = Saves; ERA = Earned run average; SO = Strikeouts

Farm system

The Brewers' farm system consisted of six minor league affiliates in 2004.

References

2004 Milwaukee Brewers team at Baseball-Reference
2004 Milwaukee Brewers team page at baseball-almanac.com

Milwaukee Brewers seasons
Milwaukee Brew
Milwaukee Brewers